Prigorodnoye is a rural locality (a selo) in Kizlyarsky Selsoviet, Kizlyarsky District, Republic of Dagestan, Russia. The population was 484 as of 2010. There are 7 streets.

Geography 
It is located on the left bank of the Stary Terek River.

Nationalities 
Russians, Avars, Tabasarans, Tsakhurs, Dargins, Rutuls, Kumyks and Ukrainians live there.

References 

Rural localities in Kizlyarsky District